Munshi Durga Sahai Suroor (1873-1910) also known by the pen name of Suroor Jahanabadi was an Indian Urdu poet.

Biography
Munshi Durga Sahai Suroor was born in December 1873 in Jahanabad, a town in the Pilibhit district. He was studious from his childhood and learned Arabic and Persian and elementary English.

He worked in the editorial department of Zamana, a magazine published from Kanpur. He also contributed to many literary journals like Adib, Makhzan, Ismat and Urdu-i-Mualla.

He was an alcoholic throughout his life. He died on 3 December 1910 at a young age of 37.

Works
Much of Suroor's work is published in the collections, Khumkhana-e-Suroor and Jam-i-Suroor published in 1911 Another collection Khumkada-e-Suroor was posthumously published in 1930. He wrote patriotic as well as religious poems. His major patriotic poems are Khak-e-Watan (The Dust of the Motherland), Urus-e-Hubie-Watan (The Love of the Bride of the Country), Hasrat-e-Watan (The Longing of the country), Yaad-e-Watan (Memory of the Country), Madar-e-Hind (Mother India), Gul-e-Bulbul ka fasana (The story of rose and nightingale) and Sham-o-Parwana (The Moth and the Candle). His poem Badnasib Bengal was written during the partition of Bengal proposed by Lord Curzon.

His notable historical poems are Padmani, Padmani ki Chitah (The Funeral pyre of Padmani), Sitaji-ki-Giria-o-Zari (the Lament of Sita), Dasrat ki bekarari (The Tribulations of Maharaja Dasrat), Jamuna-Ganga, Sati, and Nur Jahan ka mazar (Tomb of Nur Jahan).

Suroor's poetry is repleated with the employment of Hindi words and words of indigenous origins. His poetry is also filled with imagery from the old Hindu mythology. Much of his poetry is written in six-line stanzas or mussuddus, however he used many other forms like masnavi, rubai, qita, qasida and ghazal.

References

Cited sources
 
 

19th-century Indian poets
Urdu-language poets
1873 births
1910 deaths
Poets in British India